Bartonella callosciuri is a bacterium from the genus Bartonella.

References

External links
Type strain of Bartonella callosciuri at BacDive -  the Bacterial Diversity Metadatabase

Bartonellaceae
Bacteria described in 2013